The Major-General George R. Pearkes Building (often abbreviated as just Pearkes and referred to as '101 Col By') is the principal location of Canada's National Defence Headquarters (NDHQ) and is located in downtown Ottawa, Ontario. NDHQ actually comprises a collection of offices spread across the National Capital Region, however it is most commonly identified with the Major-General George R. Pearkes Building at 101 Colonel By Drive in Ottawa.

The building is currently occupied (as of 2022) by senior defence and military staff, procurement and policy officials, intelligence specialists, legal affairs and staff involved in infrastructure.

History

The building, named after Major-General G.R. Pearkes, was constructed between 1969 and 1974, and was originally intended for use by the Department of Transport. When a planned National Defence Headquarters complex on the LeBreton Flats was not built, however, DND acquired the Colonel By Drive structure. In 1972, the Department of Transportation moved into Place de Ville's newly completed Tower C.

The concept for the group of buildings was developed by French town planner Jacques Gréber immediately after World War II at the invitation of Prime Minister William Lyon Mackenzie King. Gréber, a proponent of boulevards and highways as opposed to rail corridors, advised that the city redevelop the east bank of the Rideau Canal which was, at that time, covered with railway tracks leading to Ottawa Union Station.

This design was accomplished with the removal of the station tracks and relocation of passenger rail service to a new suburban station; the Ottawa Union Station building has since become the Government Conference Centre.  The remaining land that contained the coach yard for Ottawa Union Station was vacant and ready for developments that would contain the Pearkes Building and the Rideau Centre.

Architects John C. Parkin, Searle, Wilby, and Rowland designed the buildings in the then-popular Brutalist style. They were conceived as the first phase of the planned redevelopment, the Rideau Centre, which opened in 1983, being the second phase.

Possible relocation

The MGen George R. Pearkes Building underwent extensive renovations from the mid-1990s as each floor was gutted to replace the hodge podge of outdated offices and furnishings dating to the building's opening in 1974. Modular office furnishings produced by CORCAN (constructed in Canadian prisons) were installed.

By the mid-2000s it became apparent that the NDHQ complex at the MGen George R. Pearkes Building was overcrowded, forcing DND to spread some headquarters staff across the National Capital Region. Sizeable NDHQ offices have been established in the past, or are still currently located in, Place Export Canada, the Constitution Building, l'Esplanade Laurier, Louis St Laurent Building (Gatineau, QC) and the Berger Building, among others.

Recent cutbacks among high-technology companies in the Ottawa region led DND to consider buying a surplus JDS Uniphase campus in suburban Barrhaven at the intersection of Merivale Road and Prince of Wales Drive, west of the Ottawa International Airport. JDS's former Barrhaven campus comprises two large buildings with extensive computer networking capacity, and is currently selling for a fraction of its construction cost. The location was perceived to be far more secure, being set back from public roads, and has ample parking and transit connections for the several thousand employees it was designed to support. The Royal Canadian Mounted Police now occupy this property.

In 2017, DND Canada debunked rumors that other federal government agencies will occupy the Pearkes building; it will still be used by DND staff.

In January 2022, the Pearkes building is half empty despite plans to have all staff relocated to NDHQ Carling for renovations to start, which would require four years to complete.

Carling Campus Relocation (Pentagon North)
DND is in the process of relocating some of their personnel to the former Nortel R&D facility at Carling Campus in 2017.

Design

Attack vulnerability

The threat of terrorist attacks in recent decades, particularly following the September 11, 2001 attacks, led to the permanent closure of an access road that runs beneath the connecting section of the two structures comprising the MGen George R. Pearkes Building. The interior mezzanine corridor connecting the north and south towers has been closed to all but pass holders since the 1990s.

A dramatic architectural feature (and potential vulnerability), it was initially cordoned off using temporary concrete barriers. Work has now been completed permanently closing off the thoroughfare that formerly linked Nicholas Street to Colonel By Drive and the adjacent Rideau Canal by building permanent concrete barriers, metal fencing, and a gatehouse equipped with the capability to stop unauthorised vehicles from entering.

References

Federal government buildings in Ottawa
Military installations of Canada
Brutalist architecture in Canada